Daniel Segal (born 1947) is a British mathematician and a Professor of Mathematics at the University of Oxford. He specialises in algebra and group theory.

He studied at Peterhouse, Cambridge, before taking a PhD at Queen Mary College, University of London, in 1972, supervised by Bertram Wehrfritz, with a dissertation on group theory entitled Groups of Automorphisms of Infinite Soluble Groups. He is an Emeritus Fellow of All Souls College at Oxford, where he was sub-warden from 2006 to 2008.

His postgraduate students have included Marcus du Sautoy and Geoff Smith. He is the son of psychoanalyst Hanna Segal and brother of philosopher Gabriel Segal as well of Michael Segal, a senior civil servant.

Publications

Articles

Books
Polycyclic Groups, Cambridge University Press 1983; 2005 pbk edition
with J. Dixon, M. Du Sautoy, A. Mann Analytic pro-p-groups, Cambridge University Press 1999, Paperback edn. 2003
ed. with M. Du Sautoy, A. Shalev New horizons in pro-p-groups, Birkhäuser 2000 Paperback edn. 2012
with Alexander Lubotzky Subgroup growth, Birkhäuser 2003 Paperback edn. 2012
Words: notes on verbal width in groups, London Mathematical Society Lecture Notes, vol. 361, Cambridge University Press 2009

References

Living people
20th-century British mathematicians
21st-century British mathematicians
Alumni of Peterhouse, Cambridge
Alumni of the University of London
Fellows of All Souls College, Oxford
Group theorists
Algebraists
1947 births